Six Metamorphoses after Ovid (Op. 49) is a piece of program music for solo oboe written by English composer Benjamin Britten in 1951.

History
The piece was inspired by Ovid's Metamorphoses. It is dedicated to oboist Joy Boughton, daughter of Benjamin Britten's friend and fellow composer Rutland Boughton, who gave the first performance at the Aldeburgh Festival on 14 June 1951.

Structure
Each of the six sections is based on a character from Roman mythology who is briefly described:

 Pan, "who played upon the reed pipe which was Syrinx, his beloved."
 Phaeton, "who rode upon the chariot of the sun for one day and was hurled into the river Padus by a thunderbolt."
 Niobe, "who, lamenting the death of her fourteen children, was turned into a mountain."
 Bacchus, "at whose feasts is heard the noise of gaggling women's tattling tongues and shouting out of boys."
 Narcissus, "who fell in love with his own image and became a flower."
 Arethusa, "who, flying from the love of Alpheus the river god, was turned into a fountain."

The piece is between 10 and 15 minutes in length.

Music
The music of the first metamorphosis echoes the "free-spirited" character of its titular figure: it is unmeasured and includes frequent pauses. This contrasts with the second metamorphosis, a quick and rhythmic representation of the chariot ride of Phaeton, marked vivace ritmico. The third is slower and is marked piangendo, or "crying". The four-part fourth metamorphosis reflects the atmosphere of a drunken feast or festival. The fifth, marked lento piacevole, is meant to convey the act of staring at a reflection in a pool. The work concludes with a "pleasant and meandering" representation of beauty and flow.

See also

 List of characters in Metamorphoses

References

External links
 "Benjamin Britten and his Metamorphosis" by George Caird, UCE Conservatoire, 2006 - Double Reed News, No 76
 Youtube video: Benjamin Britten - Six Metamorphoses after Ovid / Xiaodi Liu / Festival Mozaic, oboe solo

Compositions by Benjamin Britten
Solo oboe pieces
1951 compositions
Music based on Metamorphoses